Game & Graphics (sometimes written Game And Graphics) is a documentary blog about the visual creativity in the videogame culture.

The website contains a huge and selected collection of videogame design works and creativity, including logotypes, printed advertising, cover and label design, packaging, book and magazine design, official artworks and illustrations, and sprite design among others. This selection is specially focused on classic gaming and with a prominent presence of Japanese game design.

History
The site was created in 2010 by Daruma Studio, a graphic design studio originally based in Barcelona, run by freelance designer Sebastià López. After working for several videogame developers, Sebastià found that there was a lack of websites focused on gaming culture graphics, excluding from here random collections of fan art.

The idea was to create a blog site edited and curated from the perspective of an experienced graphic designer, where other graphic designers could find inspiration from the best visual designs in the history of videogames, and at the same time an enjoyable place for videogame culture enthusiasts.

After some years of running, Daruma Studio also has contributed to the site with original designs that pay tribute to some of the biggest icons of gaming culture in the form of t-shirts, limited collections of printed works, illustrations and animated GIFs.

My Famicase Exhibition participation
Game & Graphics and Daruma Studio have been part of the collective exhibition "My Famicase" since 2010. My Famicase is an exhibition organized in Tokyo by Satoshi Sakagami, designer and owner of Meteor shop, and every year shows fictional Famicom cartridge labels made by designers, illustrators and artists.

Game & Graphics and Daruma Studio were in 2010 one of the first non-Japanese designers to participate in the exhibition.

Other notable participations
 Game & Graphics participated in the retrogaming fair RetroBarcelona with a booth (2013).
 Some Game & Graphics original designs will be featured in the upcoming book "Everyday is Play" (GamePaused, 2014).

References

External links 
 Game & Graphics official website
 Daruma Studio website
 My Famicase exhibition website
 RetroBarcelona website
 Everyday is Play book site

Computer graphics organizations
Video game websites